Cotoneaster frigidus, the  tree cotoneaster, is a species of flowering plant in the genus Cotoneaster of the family Rosaceae, native to the Himalayas. White flowers are followed by masses of small, globose, red fruits (pomes) in autumn, persisting into winter if not eaten by birds.

It is widely grown in parks and gardens in temperate regions. The more compact cultivar 'Cornubia' (syn. C. × watereri 'Cornubia') has gained the Royal Horticultural Society's Award of Garden Merit.

References

frigidus